Vasant Chavan (1942 – 11 July 2006) was a member of Rajya Sabha from Maharashtra state during the terms 25 April 2005 to 2 April 2006 as Nationalist Congress Party candidate, in bye-elections unopposed after the resignation of then Shiv Sena Rajya Sabha member Sanjay Nirupam. He was elected for second term from 03/04/2006 to 02/04/2012.

He had member of Maharashtra Legislative Council for 3 terms until 2004. Chavan had a large following among the Mehtar Valmiki community and his brilliant academic record had earned him many admirers, including the political leader like Sharad Pawar.

References

Chavan Vasant
Politicians from Pune
1942 births
2006 deaths
Members of the Maharashtra Legislative Council
Marathi politicians
Nationalist Congress Party politicians from Maharashtra
20th-century Indian politicians